Galié is a commune in the Haute-Garonne department in southwestern France.

Population

Sights
The Château de Galié is a ruined 13th and 14th century castle which has been listed since 1970 as a historic site by the French Ministry of Culture.

See also
Communes of the Haute-Garonne department

References

Communes of Haute-Garonne